Enem is an urban locality (an urban-type settlement) in Takhtamukaysky District of the Republic of Adygea, Russia, located on the Krasnodar–Novorossiysk auto route,  northwest of Maykop, the capital of the republic. As of the 2020 Census, its population was 20,372.

History
It was founded in 1890 as a khutor and was granted the work settlement status on November 17, 1967.

Administrative and municipal status
Within the framework of administrative divisions, the urban-type settlement of Enem is subordinated to Takhtamukaysky District. As a municipal division, Enem, together with four rural localities, is incorporated within Takhtamukaysky Municipal District as Enemskoye Urban Settlement.

Transportation
There is an airport and a railway station in Enem.

Notable people
Soviet cosmonaut Anatoly Berezovoy was born in Enem.

Twin towns and sister cities

Enem is twinned with:
 Kfar Kama, Israel

References

Notes

Sources

External links
Unofficial website of Enem 

Urban-type settlements in Adygea
Populated places established in 1890